Lumezi is a constituency of the National Assembly of Zambia. It covers Chidonga, Chikuni, Chitungulu, Chikwinda, Chombelao, Kalatika, Kalikwe, Kawinga, Lumezi, Mukuku and Mwimba in Lumezi District of Eastern Province.

List of MPs

References

Constituencies of the National Assembly of Zambia
1973 establishments in Zambia
Constituencies established in 1973